The general election for mayor of Fort Lauderdale was held on May 13, 2018. It saw the election of Dean Trantalis.

Results
During the May 13 municipal elections, voter turnout in Broward County, where Fort Lauderdale is located, was 12.42%.

References

2018 United States mayoral elections
2018
2018 Florida elections